Attorney General Hunt may refer to:

Alan Hunt (politician) (1927–2013), Attorney-General of Victoria
George Hunt (attorney) (1841–1901), Attorney General of Illinois
William H. Hunt (1823–1884), Attorney General of Louisiana

See also
General Hunt (disambiguation)